Onni Antero Väyrynen (26 September 1916 – 2 August 1970) was a Finnish civil servant and politician, born in Kemijärvi. He served as Minister of the Interior from 1 December 1967 to 14 May 1970. He was a member of the Parliament of Finland from 1962 until his death in 1970, representing the Social Democratic Party of Finland (SDP).

References

1916 births
1970 deaths
People from Kemijärvi
People from Oulu Province (Grand Duchy of Finland)
Social Democratic Party of Finland politicians
Ministers of the Interior of Finland
Members of the Parliament of Finland (1962–66)
Members of the Parliament of Finland (1966–70)